Pasha Hawaii is an American shipping company specializing in the trade between Hawaii and the continental United States. The Current President and CEO of the company is George W. Pasha, IV.

Overview
The firm dates back to 1949, and it is now part of Pasha Group, based in San Rafael, California.

It provides the largest transportation between the USA and Hawaii, the company owns 6 active vessels.

In 2004, the firm commissioned the Jean Anne, a roll-on roll-off vessel.

In 2015, the firm commissioned the Marjorie C a vessel with features of both a container vessel and ro-ro.

In 2015, the firm purchased competing shipping firm Horizon Lines's Hawaii operations.

In 2017 the International Organization of Masters, Mates & Pilots (MM&P) filed a complaint against Pasha Hawaii, before the National Labor Relations Board (NLRB).  They asserted Pasha Hawaii was designing two new vessels without sharing blueprints with their organization.

The Honolulu Star-Advertiser reported, on September 19, 2017, that Pasha Hawaii announced it had ordered two new vessels, to be completed in 2020.  It noted that a third shipping company, TOTE Incorporated, had announced it too would be offering a service between Hawaii and the continental USA, competing with Pasha Hawaii and Matson.

As of today, the company specializes in the maritime transport and distribution of shipping containers, automobiles, trucks, trailers, Mafi roll trailers, heavy construction machineries and further types of static and rolling freight.

History 
The company's roots to Hawaii started during WWII when the troops needed storage services. To accommodate these needs, a station was set up in San Francisco to help the deployed troops. George W. Pasha, the founder, had a large amount of acquired knowledge about the automotive industry and started the company after seeing the demand for storage and transportation. His son George W. Pasha, III, realized the potential of the company and helped formed the company into what it is today.

The company realized that there was a need for shipping goods from Hawaii to and from the Pacific Coast and began Pasha Hawaii in 1999. After creating the company they produced their first ship, M/V Jean Anne. The M/V Marjorie was added to the fleet in 2015 due to the high demand of more shipping between their routes.

In 2015 the company also purchased competing shipping company Horizon Lines.

Then later in 2018 the company announced the conversion to LNG with the building of two new ships.

Fleet 
The 579-foot Jean Anne was commissioned in 2004 as the company's first ship. The Jean Anne is a ro-ro, a ship designed specifically to carry vehicles. The $90 million ship was designed to carry 3,000 vehicles on each trip. Its ports of call include Honolulu, Kahului and Hilo.

The 692-foot Marjorie C was commissioned in 2015 as the company's second ship. The Marjorie C is a con-ro, a hybrid ro-ro with the ability to carry containerized cargo as well as vehicles. The ship can carry 1,200 vehicles and 1,400 TEUs of containers. The ship's ports of call include Honolulu and Los Angeles, usually carrying 30 percent cars, 10 percent oversized items, and 60 percent containers.

Additionally, Pasha Hawaii operates several container ships, including the Horizon Enterprise, Horizon Reliance, Horizon Pacific and Horizon Spirit. Two new Ohana-class vessels were scheduled to enter service in late 2020, but as of March 2021 they are not listed on the company's website. These ships will have a capacity of 2,525 TEUs of containers and Liquefied natural gas (LNG)-powered propulsion systems built by MAN Energy Solutions. These will be the first LNG-powered vessels to operate between Hawaii and the West Coast.

Gallery

See also
List of largest container shipping companies
Nippon Yusen Kaisha
American Roll-on Roll-off Carrier
Siem Shipping
Toyofuji Shipping
George Berovich
Merchant Marine Act of 1920

References

External links

Shipping companies of the United States
Ro-ro shipping companies
Car carrier shipping companies
Container shipping companies of the United States
Container shipping companies